Into the Mirror is a 2003 South Korean supernatural horror film about a series of grisly deaths in a department store, all involving mirrors, and the troubled detective who investigates them. It was the debut film of director Kim Sung-ho.

Plot
After accidentally causing the death of his partner during a hostage situation, Wu Young-min quits the police force to work for his uncle as head security of Dreampia, an immense shopping center. Dreampia is currently in the rebuilding stages as a fire destroyed parts of it five years ago. The re-opening was scheduled in a few days, until some strange murders begin to occur in the building. It seems that the victims, all employees of the mall, have committed suicide in very gruesome and unconventional ways.

Young-min is very suspicious about the police explanation, and starts his own investigation, but unfortunately for him, an old acquaintance, Ha Hyun-su, is in charge of the police investigation. Hyun-su still blames Young-min for the death of their friend and is not interested in cooperation. The more clues they stumble on, the more strange and unnatural the truth becomes.

The film explores the theory of dualism, doppelgangers and the Other through the visual medium of mirrors and reflections.

Cast
 Yoo Ji-tae as Wu Young-min
 Kim Hye-na as Lee Ji-hyun
 Kim Myung-min as Ha Hyun-su

Remake
An American remake was produced in 2008, titled Mirrors. The story was changed for the most part, although the basic idea and several scenes remained intact.

Into the Mirror was released on the flip side of the unrated version of the Mirrors 2 DVD.

References

External links
 
 

2003 horror films
2000s supernatural horror films
Cinema Service films
2000s Korean-language films
2003 films
South Korean films remade in other languages
South Korean ghost films
South Korean supernatural horror films
2000s South Korean films